Aberdeen and Kincardine East (or East Aberdeenshire and Kincardineshire) was a county constituency of the House of Commons of the Parliament of the United Kingdom from 1918 to 1950. The constituency elected one Member of Parliament (MP) by the first past the post system of election.

As created in 1918, the constituency was largely a replacement for Eastern Aberdeenshire. In 1950, it was replaced by East Aberdeenshire.

Boundaries 

Aberdeen and Kincardine East was created by the Representation of the People Act 1918 and first used in the 1918 general election. The constituency was entirely within the county of Aberdeen and one of five constituencies covering the county of Aberdeen, the city of Aberdeen and the county of Kincardine (except that the Kincardine burgh of Inverbervie was part of a sixth constituency, Montrose Burghs). Also entirely within the county of Aberdeen, there was Aberdeen and Kincardine Central. Kincardine and West Aberdeen covered the county of Kincardine (minus the burgh of Inverbervie) and part of the county of Aberdeen.

Aberdeen and Kincardine East consisted of "The county districts of Deer and Turriff, inclusive of all burghs situated therein." Therefore, it included the burghs of Fraserburgh, Peterhead, Rosehearty and Turriff.

The same boundaries were used in the 1922 general election, the 1923 general election, the 1924 general election, the 1929 general election, the 1931 general election, the 1935 general election and the 1945 general election.

The House of Commons (Redistribution of Seats) Act 1949 created new boundaries for the 1950 general election. Aberdeen and Kincardine East was merged with part of Aberdeen and Kincardine Central to form East Aberdeenshire, which was one of four constituencies covering the county of Aberdeen and the city of Aberdeen. East Aberdeenshire and West Aberdeenshire were entirely within the county, and Aberdeen North and Aberdeen South were entirely within the city.

Members of Parliament

Election results

Elections in the 1910s

Elections in the 1920s

Elections in the 1930s

Elections in the 1940s

References

See also

 Former United Kingdom Parliament constituencies

Historic parliamentary constituencies in Scotland (Westminster)
History of Aberdeenshire
Constituencies of the Parliament of the United Kingdom established in 1918
Constituencies of the Parliament of the United Kingdom disestablished in 1950
Kincardineshire
Politics of Aberdeenshire